The uMhlathuze Local Municipality council consists of sixty-seven members elected by mixed-member proportional representation. Thirty-four councillors are elected by first-past-the-post voting in thirty-four wards, while the remaining thirty-three are chosen from party lists so that the total number of party representatives is proportional to the number of votes received.

The municipality was enlarged at the time of the South African municipal election, 2016 when part of the disbanded Ntambanana Local Municipality was merged into it.

In the election of 3 August 2016 the African National Congress (ANC) won a majority of forty-three seats on the council.

In the 2021 South African municipal elections the ANC lost its majority, winning a plurality of twenty-seven seats on the council.

Results 
The following table shows the composition of the council after past elections.

December 2000 election

The following table shows the results of the 2000 election.

March 2006 election

The following table shows the results of the 2006 election.

May 2011 election

The following table shows the results of the 2011 election.

August 2016 election

The following table shows the results of the 1916 election.

November 2021 election

The following table shows the results of the 2021 election.

The African National Congress lost its majority, and an Inkatha Freedom Party (IFP) led coalition, supported by the Democratic Alliance (DA) and Economic Freedom Fighters (EFF), took control of the municipality. Nkonzoyakhe Donda (IFP) was elected mayor, Nkululeko Ngubane (EFF) deputy mayor and Tobias Gumede (IFP) Speaker.

By-elections from November 2021
The following by-elections were held to fill vacant ward seats in the period from the election in November 2021.

The by-election took place after the ANC representative, facing community pressure, resigned. With the victory, the IFP solidified its coalition hold on council.

References

uMhlathuze